The Contact Point for Roma and Sinti Issues is the main structure within the Organization for Security and Cooperation in Europe (OSCE) assisting governments in implementing their commitments relating to the rights of Roma and Sinti populations. The Contact Point is located within the Warsaw-based OSCE Office for Democratic Institutions and Human Rights (ODIHR). 

The Contact Point was created by the participating States of the OSCE at the 1994 Budapest Summit. Its mandate was strengthened at the 1998 Ministerial Council in Oslo. 

One of the Contact Point's main tasks is to assist the participating States of the OSCE to implement the OSCE Action Plan on Improving the Situation of Roma and Sinti adopted with consensus in 2003.

References

External links
 Official website

Organization for Security and Co-operation in Europe
Romani in Europe
Romani rights
Sinti